Mario Mendell Winans (born August 29, 1974) is an American singer, songwriter, and record producer best known for his 2004 song "I Don't Wanna Know", which reached number 2 in the United States and number 1 in the United Kingdom. Winans also co-wrote CeCe Winans's song "Pray", which won a Grammy Award for Best Gospel Performance.

Career

Hurt No More (2001–2005)
Mario Winans recorded his second album Hurt No More in 2001, 2002, and 2003 in between working with other artists. The album is based on stories of love and betrayal.

The first single "I Don't Wanna Know" was based on a sample of the Fugees' 1996 hit single "Ready or Not", which itself was based on a slowed-down sample of the instrumental track "Boadicea" by Enya from her 1987 self-titled album. Enya and her representatives said yes to Winans and P. Diddy for her approval of the sample. She even re-recorded Boadicea for the song, although Winans had no idea that the Fugees sample he had used was a sample itself. They even gave Enya herself credit for the single as "Mario Winans featuring P. Diddy and Enya". The song features a rap by P. Diddy. The song was released as the single in early 2004 and became a worldwide hit, reaching number 1 in Germany and the United Kingdom and on the rhythmic top 40 radio chart in the United States; to number 2 on the Billboard Hot 100 and the US R&B/Hip-Hop singles chart; and to number 3 on both the Australian and Norwegian singles charts. It also reached the top ten on a composite European singles chart.

Hurt No More was released on April 20, 2004, in the US and by early June 2004 had reached number 1 on the Billboard R&B/Hip-Hop Albums chart, number 2 on the Billboard 200, and number 3 on the UK Albums Chart.

The album's second single, "Never Really Was", used a sample of the orchestrated beginning of Madonna's 1986 hit "Papa Don't Preach" as its background music. However, the song failed to chart in North America. A remix version was released as a single featuring rapper Lil Flip.

The song "This Is the Thanks I Get" was stated to be the album's third and final single but no official release was set. The song went on to peak on the Billboard Bubbling Under R&B chart at number 12.

Discography

Albums

Singles

As featured artist

Production
2009
Diddy - Press Play
 "Last Night" (featuring Keyshia Cole), "Through the Pain (She Told Me)", "Thought You Said" (featuring Brandy)

Awards and nominations

 Grammy Awards
 2005, Best Contemporary R&B Album: Hurt No More (Nominated)
 Grammy Awards
2016, Best Rap Song: "All Day" (Nominated; as writer/co-producer)
 Image Awards
 2005, Outstanding New Artist (Nominated)
 MOBO Awards
 2004, Best Song: "I Don't Wanna Know" (Nominated)
 2004, Best Ringtone: "I Don't Wanna Know" (Winner)
 Vibe Awards
 2004, R&B Song of the Year: "I Don't Wanna Know" (Nominated)

Filmography
 Mike Jones - American Dream (2007)

References

External links
 Official website
 [ Mario Winans] at Billboard.com
 AllMusic Mario Winans article
 VH1 Mario Winans page

1974 births
Living people
20th-century African-American male singers
American gospel singers
Urban contemporary gospel musicians
Singers from Detroit
American contemporary R&B singers
Bad Boy Records artists
African-American male singer-songwriters
African-American record producers
Record producers from South Carolina
American hip hop singers
Winans family
21st-century African-American male singers
Singer-songwriters from Michigan
Singer-songwriters from South Carolina